Both Sides Now is a concept album by Canadian singer-songwriter Joni Mitchell that was released in 2000. It is her 17th studio album. The album won two Grammy Awards in 2001 for Best Traditional Pop Vocal Album and Best Instrumental Arrangement Accompanying Vocalist(s) for the song "Both Sides Now" and a Juno Award for Vocal Jazz Album of the Year.

Background and release 
The album traces the progress of the modern relationship through Mitchell's orchestral renditions of classic jazz songs. Two of her own songs are included: "A Case of You" (1971) and "Both Sides Now" (1969). The orchestra was arranged and conducted by Vince Mendoza.

In the liner notes, co-producer Larry Klein describes the album as "a programmatic suite documenting a relationship from initial flirtation through optimistic consummation, metamorphosing into disillusionment, ironic despair, and finally resolving in the philosophical overview of acceptance and the probability of the cycle repeating itself".

A limited run of copies was released on February 8, 2000, in chocolate box packaging for Valentine's Day with several lithographs of Mitchell paintings. A jewel case edition was released on March 20, 2000.

On tour, Mitchell performed the songs in the same sequence as the album, but she opened with the overture "Nuages", the first movement from Nocturnes, an orchestral suite composed by Claude Debussy. "Nuages" is the French word for "clouds". Although the music sets a romantic mood, the use of this piece can be seen as a pun since Clouds is the name of the album on which the song "Both Sides Now" made its appearance.

Track listing

Personnel 
 
 Joni Mitchell – vocals 	
 Mark Isham – trumpet
 Richard Henry – bass trombone
 Dave Stewart – bass trombone
 Owen Slade – tuba
 Wayne Shorter – soprano and tenor saxophone
 Skaila Kanga – harp
 Herbie Hancock – piano
 David Arch – piano
 Chuck Berghofer – bass guitar
 Mike Brittain – bass guitar
 Mary Scully – bass guitar
 Chris Laurence – double bass
 Peter Erskine – drums
 Frank Ricotti – percussion
 Andrew Findon – flute
 Helen Keen – flute
 Jamie Talbot – flute, alto flute, clarinet, alto saxophone
 Philip Todd – flute, alto flute, clarinet
 Stan Sulzmann – flute, clarinet
 Nicholas Bucknall – clarinet
 John Anderson – oboe
 Sue Bohling – oboe, cor Anglais
 Anthony Pike – clarinet, bass clarinet
 Iain Dixon – clarinet, bass clarinet
 Julie Andrews – bassoon
 Gavin McNaughton – bassoon
 Richard Skinner – contrabassoon
 Andy Crowley, Derek Watkins, Gerard Presencer, John Barclay, Steve Sidwell – trumpet
 Hugh Seenan, John Pigneguy, Michael Thompson, Nigel Black, Paul Gardham, Philip Eastop, Richard Watkins – French horn
 Neil Sidwell, Pete Beachill, Peter Davies, Richard Edwards – trombone
 Antonia Fuchs, Ben Cruft, Boguslaw Kostecki, Cathy Thompson, Chris Tombling, David Woodcock, Dermot Crehan, Everton Nelson, Godfrey Salmon, Jackie Shave, Jim McLeod, Jonathan Strange, Julian Leaper, Katherine Shave, Maciej Rakowski, Matthew Scrivener, Michael McMenemy, Patrick Kiernan, Perry Montague-Mason, Peter Oxer, Rebecca Hirsch, Rita Manning, Roger Garland, Simon Fischer, Vaughn Armon, Warren Zielinski, Wilf Gibson – violin
 Bill Benham, Bruce White, Catherine Bradshaw, Donald McVay, Ivo Van Der Werff, Katie Wilkinson, Peter Lale, Rachel Bolt – viola
 Anthony Pleeth, Davd Daniels, Frank Schaefer, Helen Liebmann, Martin Loveday, Paul Kegg, Tony Lewis – cello
 Gavyn Wright – concertmaster, violin
 Vince Mendoza – arranger, conductor
 Gordon Jenkins – co-arranger on "Stormy Weather"

Charts

Certifications

References

External links
  by Joni Mitchell from her 2000 album "Both Sides Now'"  (with lyrics). (Video - 5:51 minutes)

2000 albums
Albums arranged by Vince Mendoza
Albums produced by Larry Klein
Albums with cover art by Joni Mitchell
Grammy Award for Best Traditional Pop Vocal Album
Joni Mitchell albums
Juno Award for Vocal Jazz Album of the Year albums
Orchestral jazz albums
Reprise Records albums
Traditional pop albums